Hans Breuer (16 September 1930  13 June 2021) was the mayor of Augsburg for eighteen years between 1972 and 1990. He was a Sudeten German and a member of the Social Democratic Party of Germany. One of his most memorable achievements was the grand celebration of Augsburg's 2,000 years of existence in 1985. In 1991 Breuer became an honorary citizen of the city of Augsburg.

References

External links
 Biography of Hans Breuer

1930 births
2021 deaths
Mayors of Augsburg
Recipients of the Cross of the Order of Merit of the Federal Republic of Germany
Social Democratic Party of Germany politicians
Sudeten German people
People from Opava